Hoplosternum punctatum is a species of catfish of the family Callichthyidae. This species is only found in the Atrato River basin in Colombia and in the Pacific coastal drainages of Panama, in southern Central America.

References 
 

Callichthyidae
Freshwater fish of Colombia
Fish of Panama
Fish described in 1916